The Province of Queensland is an ecclesiastical province of the Anglican Church of Australia; its territorial remit includes the Northern Territory and the state of Queensland. The province consists of four dioceses: Brisbane, North Queensland, The Northern Territory and Rockhampton.

The province was erected in 1905 with the Diocese of Brisbane as its metropolitan see. The incumbent (2018) Metropolitan is Phillip Aspinall, Archbishop of Brisbane.

Prior to Papua New Guinea's independence in 1975 the province also included the Diocese of New Guinea.

Reference 

 
Christianity in Queensland
Religion in the Northern Territory